Birchal is an Australian equity crowdfunding platform which captured AU$94 million of the AU$146.6 million raised in the Australian retail equity crowdfunding market during 2018 to 2021.

Birchal is licensed by the Australian Securities & Investments Commission to facilitate offers of equity in eligible unlisted public or private companies to both retail and wholesale investors under the crowdsourced funding regime of the Corporations Act, which was introduced in 2017. It was part of the first group of seven such intermediaries issued a license in early January 2018.

Birchal offered its own shares on its platform in April 2022, reaching the maximum funding target of AU$3 million in slightly over an hour, with almost 600 investors participating.

History
Birchal was founded in 2017 as a sister platform to Pozible, a reward-based crowdfunding platform, by its mutual founders. The firm commenced by targeting Pozible's user base to capitalise on new Australian equity crowdfunding regulations enacted in 2018.

References

Further reading

External links 
 Official website

Australian companies established in 2017
Equity crowdfunding platforms
Financial services companies established in 2017
Investment companies of Australia
Online financial services companies of Australia
Privately held companies of Australia